Aspidodiadema intermedium is a species of sea urchin of the family Aspidodiadematidae. Their armour is covered with spines. It is placed in the genus Aspidodiadema and lives in the sea. Aspidodiadema intermedium was first scientifically described in 1977 by Shigei.

References 

intermedium
Animals described in 1977